Agonum crenistriatum is a species of ground beetle from Platyninae subfamily. It was described by John Lawrence LeConte in 1863 and is endemic to the United States.

References

Beetles described in 1863
Beetles of North America
crenistriatum
Endemic fauna of the United States